John Reykdal (born December 12, 1943) is a Canadian football player who played for the Toronto Argonauts, Edmonton Eskimos and Calgary Stampeders.

References

Living people
1943 births
Edmonton Elks players